Lev Susany (born 19 November 1988) is a former Australian powerlifter who competed in the International Powerlifting Federation (IPF). He was a member of the Australian Powerlifting Team for 5 years, from 2010 to 2014. He has won numerous Australian, Oceania and Commonwealth Powerlifting Championships over three weight classes (74 kg, 83 kg and 93 kg).

In 2011, Susany was the No. 1 ranked raw junior powerlifter in the world in the men's 74 kg division, and also had the No. 1 ranked bench press in the world. In 2012 and 2013, Susany was the No. 3 ranked raw bench press lifter in the world in the men's 83 kg division. Susany holds numerous National, Oceania and Commonwealth records, and has the highest recorded bench press in his weight division at National, Oceania and Commonwealth level. As of 2015, Susany has broken a total of 33 powerlifting records (7 Commonwealth, 10 Oceania and 16 Australian records) over three weight classes (74 kg, 83 kg and 93 kg). He has been awarded Sportsman of the Year at both The University of Queensland and Queensland University of Technology, as well as a Full Blues Award at The University of Queensland.

Rankings

2014
 #4 World IPF Bench Press Ranking – Open Men's 93 kg division

2013
 #3 World IPF Bench Press Ranking – Open Men's 83 kg division

2012
 #3 World IPF Bench Press Ranking – Open Men's 83 kg division

2011
 #1 World IPF Powerlifting Ranking – Junior Men's 74 kg division
 #1 World IPF Bench Press Ranking – Junior Men's 74 kg division
 #1 World IPF Bench Press Ranking – Open Men's 74 kg division

Raw powerlifting records

References

UQ celebrates 100th Blues Awards
UQ Sport announces club and sports awards
2015 UQ Club & Sports Awards Winners
2012 International Powerlifting Federation Records
2011 International Powerlifting Federation Records
Powerlifting Australia - Australian Records
Oceania Powerlifting Records
Commonwealth Powerlifting Records
High performance sport « UQ Sport News
Powerlifting success at National Championships « UQ Sport News
UQ Sport News - National Powerlifting Championships
UQ strength on show at Powerlifting Championships

Living people
1988 births
Australian powerlifters